Oni Emmanuel Idigbe is the immediate past Director General of the Nigerian Institute of Medical Research (NIMR) in Yaba, Lagos, Lagos State, Nigeria. He became the substantive Director General in 2000 after acting in that capacity from 1999. His area of Research is in tuberculosis and HIV infection. He has published over 65 scientific papers in both Local and international peer review journal in this subject area.

References
 http://www.apin.harvard.edu/documents/Outlook15.pdf
 http://allafrica.com/stories/200401150680.html
 http://www.noma-project.de/htmlversion/involved/body_involved.html
 http://www.hlmresearchdev.org/docs/nigeria_docs/minutes_inaugural_meeting_loc_hlm_dec05.pdf
 
 
 http://www.hup.harvard.edu/catalog/ADEAID.html?show=contents
 http://www.sunnewsonline.com/webpages/features/goodhealth/2007/July/17/goodhealth-17-07-2007-003.htm
 http://www.nigeria-aids.org/content.cfm/1b

Living people
Nigerian medical researchers
Year of birth missing (living people)